Barry John Dancer (born 27 August 1952 in Brisbane, Queensland) is a former Australian field hockey player and coach of Australian men's national field hockey team.

As a player he competed in 48 international matches for Australia between 1973 and 1979. he was a member of the men's hockey team that won a silver medal at the 1976 Summer Olympics.

Dancer coached the English men's hockey team from 1997 to 1999 and the Great Britain team at the 2000 Summer Olympics, where the team came sixth. Dancer took up the position of Head Coach of the Australian men's national field hockey team in 2001 and retired the position after 2008 Summer Olympics.

Coaching results for the Australian team at major competitions:
2001: 2nd -  Champions Trophy
2002: 2nd - World Cup ; 5th -  Champions Trophy ; 1st - Commonwealth Games
2003: 2nd - Champions Trophy
2004: 1st - Athens Olympics
2005: 1st - Champions Trophy 
2006: 2nd - World Cup ; 4th -Champions Trophy ; 1st - Commonwealth Games
2007: 2nd - Champions Trophy
2008: 3rd - Beijing Olympics ; 1st - Champions Trophy

Australia won its first Olympic gold medal at the 2004 Athens Olympics.

Dancer was Head Coach of the Australian Institute of Sport men's hockey program from 2001 to 2008.

His son Brent Dancer has represented Australia in hockey.

References

External links
 

1952 births
Australian field hockey coaches
Australian Institute of Sport coaches
Australian male field hockey players
Australian Olympic coaches
Field hockey people from Queensland
Field hockey players at the 1976 Summer Olympics
Medalists at the 1976 Summer Olympics
Olympic field hockey players of Australia
Olympic medalists in field hockey
Olympic silver medalists for Australia
Sportspeople from Brisbane
Living people
British Olympic coaches